Time-resolved mass spectrometry (TRMS) is a strategy in analytical chemistry that uses mass spectrometry platform to collect data with temporal resolution. Implementation of TRMS builds on the ability of mass spectrometers to process ions within sub-second duty cycles. It often requires the use of customized experimental setups. However, they can normally incorporate commercial mass spectrometers. As a concept in analytical chemistry, TRMS encompasses instrumental developments (e.g. interfaces, ion sources, mass analyzers), methodological developments, and applications.

Applications 

An early application of TRMS was in the observation of flash photolysis process. It took advantage of a time-of-flight mass analyzer.
TRMS currently finds applications in the monitoring of organic reactions, formation of reactive intermediates, enzyme-catalyzed reactions, convection, protein folding, extraction, and other chemical and physical processes.

Temporal resolution 

TRMS is typically implemented to monitor processes that occur on second to millisecond time scale. However, there exist reports from studies in which sub-millisecond resolutions were achieved.

References 

Analytical chemistry
Biochemistry
Laboratory techniques
Mass spectrometry
Scientific techniques